The fourth electoral unit of the Federation of Bosnia and Herzegovina is a parliamentary constituency used to elect members to the House of Representatives of Bosnia and Herzegovina since 2000.  It consists of Zenica-Doboj Canton and Central Bosnia Canton.

Demographics

Representatives

Election results

2022 election

2018 election

2014 election

2010 election

2006 election

2002 election

2000 election

References 

Constituencies of Bosnia and Herzegovina